631 is a year.

631 may also refer to:

631, a natural number
Area code 631, a New York telephone area code serving Suffolk County